Steve Ulseth (born February 22, 1959) is an American former professional ice hockey player.

Early life
From 1977 to 1981, Ulseth played college hockey with the Minnesota Golden Gophers, scoring 84 goals and 118 assists for 202 points, while earning 48 penalty minutes, in 148 games played. In his senior year, he was recognized for his outstanding play when he was named the WCHA Most Valuable Player and was selected as a finalist for the 1981 Hobey Baker Award.

Career 
Ulseth went on to play the 1981–82 season with the Springfield Indians of the American Hockey League, and then played the 1982–83 season with the Tulsa Oilers and Peoria Prancers before retiring from professional hockey.

Ulseth is now employed as a sales representative for Miken hockey sticks.

Awards and honors

References

External links

1959 births
American men's ice hockey left wingers
Ice hockey players from Minnesota
Living people
Minnesota Golden Gophers men's ice hockey players
People from Roseville, Minnesota
Peoria Prancers players
Springfield Indians players
St. Paul Vulcans players
Tulsa Oilers (1964–1984) players
NCAA men's ice hockey national champions